3x3 basketball at the 2019 African Games was held from 21 to 25 August 2019 in Rabat, Morocco.

Schedule

Participating nations

Medalists

Medal table

References

External links 
 3x3 Basketball

2019 African Games
African Games
2019 African Games
2019
African Games